Balls 8 is a NASA Boeing NB-52B mothership which was retired in 2004 after almost 50 years of flying service with NASA. The aircraft is famous for dropping the X-15 aerospace research vehicle on 106 of the 199  X-15 program flights.

History 
Balls 8 was originally an RB-52B that was first flown on June 11, 1955, and entered service with NASA on June 8, 1959. It was modified at North American Aviation's Palmdale facility to enable it to carry the X-15. As on its NB-52A predecessor, a pylon was installed beneath the right wing between the fuselage and the inboard engines with a  section removed from the wing flap to accommodate the X-15's tail.

The modified bomber flew 159 captive-carry and launch missions for the X-15 program from June 1959 until October 1968. It was first used to launch the X-15 on its fifth flight, January 23, 1960. It also flew missions for the X-24, HiMAT, Lifting Body vehicles, X-43, early launches of the OSC Pegasus rocket, and numerous other programs.

At its retirement on 17 December 2004, Balls 8 was the oldest active B-52 in service, and the only active B-52 that was not an H model. It also had the lowest total airframe time of any operational B-52. It is on permanent public display near the north gate of Edwards Air Force Base in California.

It derives its nickname from its NASA tail number 52-008: leading zeroes plus the number 8. Among USAF personnel, it is common practice to refer to aircraft whose tail number contains two or more zeros as "Balls" and the last digit (or two digits) of its tail number.

See also
 The High and Mighty One, NB-52A serial number 52-003, is the other launch aircraft used for X-15 flights. It is on display at the Pima Air & Space Museum next to Davis-Monthan AFB in Tucson, Arizona (32.1410557 N, 110.869652 W).
 B-52B, serial number 52-005 can be seen at the Wings Over the Rockies Museum's B-52B "005", Denver, Colorado.
 List of NASA aircraft
 Cosmic Girl, a Boeing 747-41R in use by Virgin Orbit as a mothership for the Mark II LauncherOne rocket.
 Stargazer, a modified Lockheed L-1011 TriStar used as a mothership for Northrop Grumman Pegasus and Pegasus XL rockets.

References

NASA aircraft
United States special-purpose aircraft
Individual aircraft
Boeing B-52 Stratofortress
Aircraft related to spaceflight